Anthia lunae is a species of ground beetle in the subfamily Anthiinae. It was described by J. Thompson in 1859.

References

Anthiinae (beetle)
Beetles described in 1859